Togavirin (Sindbis virus protease, Sindbis virus core protein, NsP2 proteinase) is an enzyme. This enzyme catalyses the following chemical reaction

 Autocatalytic release of the core protein from the N-terminus of the togavirus structural polyprotein by hydrolysis of a -Trp-Ser- bond

This enzyme is isolated from the Sindbis and Semliki forest togaviruses.

References

External links 
 

EC 3.4.21